Lac Blanc is a lake in Chamonix-Mont-Blanc, Haute-Savoie, France.

Blanc